The Trans-Sumatra Highway (Indonesian: Jalan Raya Trans-Sumatra) is a primary north–south road in the Indonesian island of Sumatra, 2,508.5  km in length, and connecting the northern island at Banda Aceh to Bandar Lampung in the south, running through many major cities, traversing Medan, Pekanbaru, Jambi, and Palembang along the way (Sumatra East Road). Upgrade work is expected to begin in March 2013 transforming it into a full-fledged highway, including land acquisition.

The road is a major artery, carrying transmigrants (see transmigrasi) from Java to the less densely populated Sumatra, and carrying Sumatran visitors to Jakarta and Java. The Trans-Sumatra Highway forms the whole section of the Asian Highway 25 and ASEAN Highway 151 (AH151).

It consists of 4 parts, namely Jalan Raya Lintas Barat (Jalinbar), Jalan Raya Lintas Tengah (Jalinteng), Jalan Raya Lintas Timur (Jalintim), and Jalan Raya Lintas Pantai Timur.

Parts of it are being set up for controlled-access highways. The Medan–Binjai Toll Road is 17 km long and set to completed in the end of 2017.

Major cities linked by the roads

 Jalinbar (West): Padang Panjang, Padang, Painan, Bengkulu, and parts of Lampung. This route numbered as  Sumatra.
 Jalinteng (Central): Medan, Pematang Siantar, Parapat, Tarutung, Padang Sidempuan, Bonjol, Bukittinggi, Singkarak, Bandar Jaya and Bandar Lampung. This route numbered as  Sumatra.
 Jalintim (East): Banda Aceh, Lhokseumawe, Langsa, Pangkalan Brandan, Binjai, Medan, Limapuluh, Kisaran, Rantau Prapat, Pekanbaru, Pangkalan Kerinci, Jambi, Palembang, Indralaya, Bandar Jaya. This route numbered as  Sumatra.

Controlled-access highway planning

In 2012, the Indonesian government had planned to build the Trans-Sumatra toll road that connects Lampung to Aceh along 2,700 kilometers. The government will allocate Rp 150 trillion for the construction of the toll roads. In the early stages, the toll road parts which is ready to be built are Padang–Sicincin Toll Road (27 km) and Medan–Kualanamu–Tebing Tinggi Toll Road.

Progress

 Medan–Tebing Tinggi Toll Road is divided into 2 sections:
 Section-1: Medan-Perbarakan-Kualanamu (17.8 km) has been kicked off in September 2014 and the land acquisition has reached 83 percent and construction finished reached 15 percent at end of 2014. It was predicted to be finished in June 2016.
 Section-2: Perbarakan-Tebing Tinggi (43.9 km), the 40-year concession deal has been signed and the land acquisition has reached 81 percent. It was predicted to be finished in 2017.

See also

Trans-Sumatra Toll Road
 Trans-Sulawesi Highway
 Trans-Java toll road

References

Sumatra
Highways in Indonesia
Asian Highway Network